The discography of Venezuelan-American duo Mau y Ricky consists of two studio albums, one extended play and nineteen singles (including three as featured artist).

Albums

Studio albums

Extended plays

Singles

As lead artist

Notes:

As featured artist

Promotional singles

Other appearances

References

Discographies of Venezuelan artists